York Township is one of twelve townships in Steuben County, Indiana, United States. As of the 2010 census, its population was 733 and it contained 291 housing units. York Township has the distinction of being Indiana's lone township to border both Michigan and Ohio as well as bordering two states on land as all other tri-points along Indiana's border are underwater.

Geography
The streams of Hanselman Branch and West Branch Fish Creek run through this township.

Unincorporated towns
 Berlien at 
 Courtney Corner at 
 Eastpoint Terminal (a tollbooth on the Indiana Toll Road)
 Metz at 
 Page at 
 York at 
(This list is based on USGS data and may include former settlements.)

Cemeteries
The township contains three cemeteries: Dygert, York, and Powers.

Major highways
    Indiana Toll Road (Interstate 80 and Interstate 90)
  U.S. Route 20

History

In the decades before it was settled by white immigrants, York Township and the surrounding area were the domain of the Potawatomi Indians.

The first recorded white settler in York Township was Fayette Barron, who built a homestead at what would become Metz in 1836. The following year saw the arrival of the Powers families, who settled in the northwest sections of the township. Two Powers brothers had scouted the area the year before, and now brought six families on a long journey from New York state.

In 1879, the Powers families and neighbors built what is now known as the Powers Church. The land for a nondenominational church (hence its other name "Free Church") had been donated in 1839 by Clark Powers, head of one of the original Powers families. The last regular services were held at the church in the 1920s. The church was restored in 1976 and added to the National Register of Historic Places in 1983.

The unincorporated village of Metz enjoyed its heyday during the late 19th and early 20th centuries. At one point or another it boasted a sawmill, a hotel, physicians, an undertaker, and several of the more typical retail shops. In 1919, the York township schools were consolidated with those of Richland Township into the Metz school.  This school, with students from kindergarten through high school, operated for 40 years, until it was closed in 1959, a victim of declining enrollment.

Education
York Township residents may obtain a free library card from the Carnegie Public Library of Steuben County.

References
Anspaugh, Colleen (1997) "Old towns", Steuben Herald-Republican, Angola, Indiana, p. A3.
 Folck, Dorsey (1956) "York Township", Harvey Morley, editor, The 1955 History, Complete County Atlas, pictorial and Biographical Album of Steuben County, Indiana, Angola, Indiana, pp. 46–47.
"Steuben County Cemeteries", Steuben County, Indiana, INGenWeb Site, accessed August 12, 2008.
Taylor, Robert M.; Stevens, Errol Wayne; Ponder, Mary Ann (1990) Indiana: A New Historical Guide, Indiana Historical Society, .
 U.S. Board on Geographic Names (GNIS)
 United States Census Bureau cartographic boundary files

External links
 Indiana Township Association
 United Township Association of Indiana

Townships in Steuben County, Indiana
Townships in Indiana